Saidu is a town in Lhuntse District in northeastern Bhutan.

See also
Swat Museum

References

External links 
Satellite map at Maplandia.com

Populated places in Bhutan